This is a list of seasons played by Beitar Tel Aviv Football Club in Israeli and European football, from 1937 (when the club was established) to the most recent completed season, including seasons in which the club was merged with Shimshon Tel Aviv (between 2001 and 2011, playing as Beitar Shimshon Tel Aviv) and with Ironi Ramla (starting from 2011, playing as Beitar Tel Aviv Ramla). It details the club's achievements in major competitions, and the top scorers for each season. Top scorers in bold were also the top scorers in the Israeli league that season. Records of minor competitions such as the Lilian Cup are not included due to them being considered of less importance than the State Cup and the Toto Cup.

History
Beitar Tel Aviv was established in 1934 as part of the Revisionist Zionist youth movement and joined Liga Bet in Liga Bet. Ahead of the 1940 season the club was promoted to the top division, finishing second in its debut season in the league and winning the Palestine Cup. The club won another cup in 1942 and won a joint championship in 1944–45. In summer 1947 the Beitar movement was outlawed by the Mandate High Commissioner, forcing the club to change its name to Nordia Tel Aviv, under which the club played until the establishment if Israel.
After the establishment of Israel the club struggled, dropping to the second division in 1961 for the first time. In 2000 the club merged with Shimshon Tel Aviv to form Beitar Shimshon Tel Aviv. In 2011 the club merged with Ironi Ramla, while Shimshon Tel Aviv left the merged club. The newly-merged club took the name Beitar Tel Aviv Ramla, moving to play in Ramla.

Seasons

As Beitar Tel Aviv

As Beitar Shimshon Tel Aviv

As Beitar Tel Aviv Ramla

Key

 P = Played
 W = Games won
 D = Games drawn
 L = Games lost
 F = Goals for
 A = Goals against
 Pts = Points
 Pos = Final position

 Leumit = Liga Leumit (National League)
 Artzit = Liga Artzit (Nationwide League)
 Premier = Liga Al (Premier League)
 Pal. League = Palestine League

 F = Final
 Group = Group stage
 QF = Quarter-finals
 QR1 = First Qualifying Round
 QR2 = Second Qualifying Round
 QR3 = Third Qualifying Round
 QR4 = Fourth Qualifying Round
 RInt = Intermediate Round

 R1 = Round 1
 R2 = Round 2
 R3 = Round 3
 R4 = Round 4
 R5 = Round 5
 R6 = Round 6
 SF = Semi-finals

Notes

References

Beitar Tel Aviv F.C.
Beitar Tel Aviv Bat Yam F.C.
 
 
 
Beitar Tel Aviv